Designated Survivor is an American political thriller drama television series created by David Guggenheim. It aired for three seasons, first on ABC and then exclusively on Netflix for the third and final season. Kiefer Sutherland stars as Thomas Kirkman, an American academic named as the designated survivor for the State of the Union address, who suddenly ascends from the position of U.S. Secretary of Housing and Urban Development to President of the United States after an explosion kills everyone ahead of him in the presidential line of succession. Kirkman deals with his inexperience as head of state while looking to uncover the truth behind the attack.

The project skipped the pilot stage. It was ordered straight to series on December 14, 2015, with a formal announcement on May 6, 2016. The first episode premiered on September 21, 2016, to an audience of over 10 million viewers. Eight days later, a full-season order was announced. The series was renewed for a second season on May 11, 2017, which premiered on September 27, 2017. In May 2018, ABC cancelled the series after two seasons. In September 2018, Netflix and Entertainment One announced they had reached a deal to pick up Designated Survivor for a third season of 10 episodes, with the latter being solely responsible for the production of the series. The third season premiered on Netflix on June 7, 2019. In July 2019, the series was cancelled by Netflix due to complications with the actors' contracts.

Premise
On the night of the State of the Union, an explosion destroys the Capitol Building, killing the President and everyone in the line of succession except for Secretary of Housing and Urban Development Thomas Kirkman, who had been named the designated survivor. Kirkman is immediately sworn in, unaware that the attack is just the beginning of what is to come. He faces many challenges throughout the series, struggling to balance his political aspirations with the challenge of being seen as a legitimate president.

Episodes

Cast and characters

Main

  Kiefer Sutherland as Thomas Adam "Tom" Kirkman, the President of the United States, sworn in following an unprecedented attack on the Capitol building which killed the entire government. He formerly held the office of Secretary of Housing and Urban Development. Kirkman is elected for a second term at the end of the third season.
 Natascha McElhone as Alexandra Jane "Alex' Kirkman (seasons 1–2), the First Lady of the United States. Prior to becoming First Lady, Alex was an immigration attorney in private practice. In season two, Alex was killed after a truck crashed into the motorcade she was traveling in.
 Adan Canto as Aaron Shore (né Rivera), the Vice President-elect of the United States. Before being put on President Kirkman's ticket in his re-election campaign last season, Aaron worked as Kirkman's first Chief of Staff until resigning after being interrogated about the terrorist attack on the Capitol in the first season. During that time, he worked as a senior aide to the Speaker of the House Kimble Hookstraten, before returning to the White House as Kirkman's National Security Advisor.
 Italia Ricci as Emily Rhodes, the spokesperson of Kirkman's presidential campaign. Since his days as HUD Secretary, she has worked for Tom, where she was his chief of staff. After Kirkman became President, she was appointed Special Advisor, and, following Aaron's resignation, his Chief of Staff until resigning from the White House to live in Florida with her mother. She later returned and was reinstated as Special Advisor.
 LaMonica Garrett as Mike Ritter (seasons 1–2), a Secret Service agent, assigned to President Kirkman's personal protection detail. Ritter was responsible for the safety of the entire Kirkman family following the Capitol attack. His character is written off the series without an explanation after season two. 
 Tanner Buchanan as Leo Kirkman (season 1; recurring season 2), Tom and Alex's son and Penny's older brother. Leo is tasked with supporting his sister Penny while his parents are busy in their new jobs. Later Leo leaves the White House for his freshman year at Stanford University.
 Kal Penn as Seth Wright, the White House Communications Director. He initially doubts Tom's abilities as President but quickly becomes one of his closest advisors. He was named Press Secretary due to his strong social skills. He was Press Secretary until his promotion to Communications Director in Season 3 by Chief of Staff Mars Harper.
 Maggie Q as Hannah Wells, a CIA Case Officer. Formerly an FBI Special Agent, she is assigned to investigate the Capitol attack, eventually solving the case and bringing those responsible to justice. In season three, after being fired from the Bureau, Hannah investigates a possible threat of bioterrorism for the CIA, ultimately leading to her death.
Jake Epstein as Chuck Russink (seasons 1–2), an FBI analyst. Chuck regularly assists Wells in her investigations, becoming one of her most trusted allies. He tends to be the behind the scenes man or the brains because of his technological genius.
 Paulo Costanzo as Lyor Boone (season 2), the White House Political Director. Lyor is a highly skilled, yet socially inept political consultant who is hired to help develop the political strategy of Kirkman's administration.
 Zoe McLellan as Kendra Daynes (season 2), a White House Counsel. Kendra is a no-nonsense attorney who previously served as counsel for the Senate Homeland Security sub-committee.
 Ben Lawson as Damian Rennett (season 2), an MI6 agent. He is assigned to assist Wells in finding the Capitol attack perpetrator. He is shot multiple times and killed by a Russian intelligence agent in a drive-by-shooting.

Recurring

Production

Development
Designated Survivor was ordered straight to series by ABC in December 2015, with a formal announcement of 13 episodes in May 2016. A month later, ABC revealed that the series would premiere on September 21, 2016. Eight days after the premiere, on September 29, 2016, ABC gave the series a full season order.

Created by David Guggenheim, the series is executive produced by Simon Kinberg, Sutherland, Suzan Bymel, Aditya Sood, and Nick Pepper. Paul McGuigan directed the pilot episode. Amy B. Harris was set to be the showrunner in February 2016, but after the series' official pick-up in May, it was announced she would be stepping down due to creative differences, and that Jon Harmon Feldman was in talks to replace her. In July 2016, Feldman was confirmed as showrunner/executive producer. In December 2016, Jeff Melvoin was hired as showrunner, replacing the departing Feldman, and supervised the second half of the season. The series was renewed for a second season on May 11, 2017, which premiered on September 27, 2017. For the second season, writer Keith Eisner serves as the showrunner. Kal Penn, who served as the associate director of the White House Office of Public Engagement and Intergovernmental Affairs from 2009 to 2011, works as a consultant for the series in addition to his portraying Seth Wright.

On May 11, 2018, ABC canceled the series after two seasons due to a high turnover of showrunners and declining ratings. Shortly after, eOne announced they were in "active discussions" with other networks to revive the show, including Netflix, which streams the series internationally. On September 5, 2018, it was confirmed that Netflix had picked up the series for a third season of 10 episodes, which was released in 2019. Neal Baer served as the series showrunner, the fifth person to do so. On April 24, 2019, it was announced that the third season was set to premiere on Netflix on June 7, 2019.

The first two seasons were produced by ABC Studios, The Mark Gordon Company, and eOne, with filming in Toronto, Ontario. For the third season, ABC Studios was not involved, with eOne (which had fully acquired the Mark Gordon Company) being the sole production company for the series.

On July 24, 2019, Netflix announced the series would not be renewed a fourth season, stating that the third season made for a satisfying final season. However, Netflix will continue to stream all three seasons on their platform.

Writing
Producers Jon Harmon Feldman and Guggenheim described the series as more than one genre, drawing inspiration from other thriller-dramas, with Guggenheim explaining, "There is a West Wing component of a man governing and his team governing our nation at this critical time. It's also the Homeland aspect of investigating the conspiracy. It also has a House of Cards component, which is the characters and the business of government through the eyes of these characters."

Casting

Kiefer Sutherland joined the cast in December 2015, playing Tom Kirkman, the United States Secretary of Housing and Urban Development who suddenly becomes President of the United States. Sutherland had no intention of returning to television; he read the first script of the series and changed his mind, saying, "I remember getting to the end of the script and thinking I was potentially holding the next 10 years of my life in my hands."

In February 2016, it was announced that Kal Penn had been cast as Kirkman's speech writer, Maggie Q as Hannah, the lead FBI agent on the bombing of the U.S. Capitol, Natascha McElhone as Kirkman's wife, an EEOC attorney, as well as Italia Ricci as Emily, Kirkman's chief of staff. Shortly after, Adan Canto had joined the series as Aaron Shore, the White House Deputy Chief of Staff. In early March, LaMonica Garrett joined the cast as Mike Ritter, Kirkman's Secret Service agent, and Tanner Buchanan and Mckenna Grace had been cast as Kirkman's children.

In July 2016, Malik Yoba was announced for a recurring role as Jason Atwood, the seasoned Deputy Director of the FBI, to appear in seven episodes, while Virginia Madsen had been cast in the recurring role of Kimble Hookstraten, a conservative Congresswoman and the designated survivor for the rival political party. A month later, Ashley Zukerman joined the series in a recurring role as Peter MacLeish, an Afghan War veteran and popular third-term Congressman. In September 2016, Mykelti Williamson was cast as Admiral Chernow, a career military man and the Chairman of the Joint Chiefs of Staff. On November 4, 2016, it was announced that Mariana Klaveno had been cast for the show as the Dark-Haired Woman, a clandestine operator in league with the people behind the Capitol attack.

For the second season, Paulo Costanzo, Zoe McLellan, and Ben Lawson joined the cast as series regulars, portraying White House Political Director Lyor Boone, White House Counsel Kendra Daynes, and Damian Rennett, respectively.

After the third season renewal announcement, it was confirmed that Kiefer Sutherland, Adan Canto, Italia Ricci, Kal Penn and Maggie Q would return as series regulars. On October 18, 2018, it was reported that Anthony Edwards, Julie White and Elena Tovar were cast in the recurring roles of Mars Harper, Lorraine Zimmer and Isabel Pardo respectively. On November 15, 2018, Lauren Holly and Benjamin Watson were cast in recurring roles as Lynn Harper and Dontae Evans, respectively.

Release

Broadcast
Designated Survivor began airing on September 21, 2016, on ABC in the United States, and CTV in Canada. Netflix aired the series outside the United States and Canada, adding the episodes weekly, with distribution handled by eOne. For the third season, Designated Survivor was released globally on Netflix. Before Netflix announced it would release the third season, an agreement had to be reached with Hulu, who held the streaming rights to the first two seasons in the United States; the first two seasons moved to Netflix in the United States and Canada during October 2018.

ABC aired the series with a TV-14 rating (some episodes were TV-PG), while Netflix applied a TV-MA rating on the show's third and final season.

Marketing
A teaser trailer for Designated Survivor was released on May 6, 2016, with the full trailer released on May 17. Producers and some of the cast members promoted the series at San Diego Comic-Con in July 2016, showing a special preview screening with co-stars Maggie Q and Kal Penn in attendance.

Home media
The first season was released on DVD in Region 1 on August 29, 2017.

The complete series featuring all three seasons was released on DVD in Region 1 on October 12, 2021.

Reception

Critical reception
Review aggregator website Rotten Tomatoes gave Season 1 of the series an approval rating of 87% based on 62 reviews, with an average rating of 7.07/10. The site's critical consensus reads, "Kiefer Sutherland skillfully delivers the drama in Designated Survivor, a fast-paced, quickly engrossing escapist political action fantasy." Metacritic reported a score of 71 out of 100 based on 35 reviews, indicating "generally favorable reviews".

Terri Schwartz from IGN gave the first episode a rating of 8.0/10, saying, "Designated Survivor is a strong debut for a show that will fit well alongside Quantico and Scandal in ABC's government-set political drama lineup." Variety said that the episode "does everything it needs to, checking off the necessary boxes for the unwilling American hero-president in efficient, compelling scenes." Chuck Barney from Mercury News called the first episode "suspenseful". Writing for TV Insider, Matt Roush compared Designated Survivor with other series as he said "fall's niftiest new drama has West Wing idealism, Homeland suspense and House of Cards political intrigue in its robust and compelling DNA." Zack Handlen from The A.V. Club wrote positively about the show and the premiere, praising Sutherland's performance and commented on the symbol of Sutherland's glasses as he said, "The glasses he's wearing serve as a way to tell us this is a different kind of hero, but they're also a form of camouflage, making it easier for us to understand why so many people would underestimate this man."

The editors of TV Guide placed Designated Survivor first among the top ten picks for the most anticipated new shows of the 2016–17 season. In writer Alexander Zalben's overall review, he pointed out the keys to one of the strongest pilots he had seen so far: "Designated Survivor is the rare show that delivers on the hype, and surpasses it," and later stating "It's shocking that a show can balance all of these elements, but credit a magnetic cast that hits the ground running, a crack script that makes the first hour feel like 10 minutes and, of course, Sutherland as the anchor that keeps it all grounded." Zalben's review concluded with this recommendation: "There's a reason Designated Survivor wasn't just the top pick across all of our Editors' lists, but also on the list compiled from TVGuide.com viewers' Watchlist adds: this is a show that delivers on its premise, feels timely, and most importantly, is a ton of fun."

On the other hand, after watching the first episode of the first season, The Guardians Brian Moylan criticized the dialogue, writing in his review that "this drama needs dialogue that won't make the citizenry's eyeballs roll", adding that the show features "meaningless platitudes" of a "we're going to do this my way" attitude, and concluded by writing, "All we're left with is a really great concept without the backing of a real leader behind it." Moylan also wrote that "there's not enough family tension for it to be a domestic drama, not enough government intrigue to make it a political show, and not enough investigation to make it a procedural." TVLines Dave Nemetz drew references between Kirkman and Jack Bauer, Kiefer Sutherland's role in drama thriller 24, writing that "Sutherland does a good job portraying Kirkman's deep ambivalence about the situation he's been handed. But when he has to play hardball with an Iranian ambassador, the tough talk comes too easily to him. It's like Kirkman has been possessed by the ghost of Jack Bauer." Nemetz also questioned the series' longevity; "As compelling as Designated Survivors concept is, it's hard to see how it will sustain itself as a weekly series."

On Rotten Tomatoes, Season 2 of the series holds an approval rating of 60% based on ten reviews, with an average rating of 5.92/10. The website's critical consensus reads, "Kiefer Sutherland remains commanding enough in Designated Survivor to get him re-elected, but this White House series' escalating earnestness may strike viewers as glaringly naive."

On Rotten Tomatoes, Season 3 of the series holds an approval rating of 67% based on nine reviews, with an average of 6.36/10. Many felt that Netflix moved the show to the left politically, taking away the sense of balance that President Kirkman was known for in the first two seasons, which made the show different from other political dramas on network television. Others criticized the overabundance of vulgarity once the show went from network television to streaming.

Ratings
The first episode set a record for DVR viewers with 7.67 million, surpassing the September 25, 2014, record of almost 7 million set by the pilot of How to Get Away with Murder.

Accolades

International adaptation

A South Korean remake titled Designated Survivor: 60 Days, developed by Studio Dragon and produced by DK E&M, premiered on tvN in South Korea and Netflix worldwide on July 1, 2019. Ji Jin-hee portrays the lead role in the series.

References

External links
 
 

 
2010s American LGBT-related drama television series
2010s American drama television series
2010s American mystery television series
2010s American political television series
2016 American television series debuts
2019 American television series endings
American Broadcasting Company original programming
American action television series
American political drama television series
American television series revived after cancellation
English-language Netflix original programming
Serial drama television series
Television series by ABC Studios
Television series by Entertainment One
Television shows filmed in Toronto
Television shows set in Washington, D.C.
Terrorism in television
United States presidential succession in fiction
White House in fiction
Television series about presidents of the United States